Nanoscale is a peer-reviewed scientific journal covering experimental and theoretical research in all areas of nanotechnology and nanoscience. It is published by the Royal Society of Chemistry. According to the Journal Citation Reports, the journal has a 2021 impact factor of 8.307.

References

External links
 

Royal Society of Chemistry academic journals
Biweekly journals
Publications established in 2009
Nanotechnology journals
English-language journals